Mar Lodj is an island in Senegal located in the Sine-Saloum region near Ndangane, and forty kilometers from Joal-Fadiouth.

External links

Atlantic islands of Senegal